The 2012 Tour of Flanders for Women was the ninth edition of the Tour of Flanders for Women single-day cycling race. It was the third race of the 2012 UCI Women's Road World Cup season. Both the start and finish were in Oudenaarde, Belgium and 70 cyclists took part in the race.

General standings (top 10)

Results from uci.ch.

References

External links

Tour of Flanders for Women
2012 UCI Women's Road World Cup
Ronde van Vlaanderen